Frank Schoeber (April 21, 1891 - July 19, 1970) was one of the pioneers of aviation.

Biography
Frank was born in New York City on April 21, 1891. He soloed a plane in August 1912 in Mineola, New York. He worked up until 1923 for some of the big plane builders... Curtiss of Hammondsport, Lawson Airlines, Navy NC-4 and the Barling bomber for the Air Force. He had a stroke in 1961. He died on July 19, 1970, at the age of 79 in Cape May, New Jersey.

Frank describes his journey in his memoirs... "In 1908, at the age of 17, I started to build models after visiting Morris Park where Aeronautical Society members were building and trying out their inventions. In February, 1910, I went to Boston with the Church Model Airplane Company of Brooklyn. At this point, I was just a visitor. In June, I participated in a competition at the 22nd Regiment Armory in NYC and won the Worlds Model Airplane record with a flight of 215’ 6”. The model flyers formed the N.Y. Model Airplane Club of which I was listed as the first Vice President.

 In 1911, I worked around Mineola as a freelance mechanic to learn more about airplane construction.

 In 1913, I got a letter from Glenn Curtiss, in Hammondsport, to come work for him. The job they gave me was assembling the June Bug, the first tractor plane they were going to build. When that was finished, I was put in the boat department where I assembled E boats for Steve MacGordon and Bill Thaw.

 In 1915, at the age of twenty-four, I went back to models again and started working on a compressed air motor for model airplanes. I had an assistant in Rudy Fink, and we developed several types of motors and planes which were the first in the United States holding records until the first gas motors appeared.

 Alfred W. Lawson, Editor of Aircraft Magazine, called me in 1917 asking me if I would like to go to Green Bay, Wisconsin, to build planes for the airforce. We built the first training plane and Lawson flew it, but it was not accepted by the government. We then designed a second plane which was a beauty, far ahead of anything that was built at the time. It flew beautifully and handles with ease, but the war stopped before the plane was accepted.

 The engineers had been working for several months, before the end of the war, on a post war Curtiss. It was the first 22-passenger cabin airliner built and flown in the United States. In September 1919, it flew from Milwaukee, Wisconsin to Bolling Field in Washington, D.C. on which flight I was a passenger with ten others. I was working for Curtiss Airplane Company in Garden City at the time and got a few days leave to be with the boys from Lawson and make the flight to Washington D.C.

 In December 1919, I got a telegram from Lawson again. He wanted me back to help build a new Airliner, much larger and with three Liberty motors. It took almost a year to complete and was wrecked on its trial flight.

 One day I got a call from John Carisi, who was supervising the Barling Bomber job in Hasbrouck Heights, to take charge of the wing building job. In 1923, we shipped the Bomber to Dayton for assembly and to test fly. I was one of five sent to Dayton to assemble and after several months of changes it was done.

 I found another job with Clarence Chamberlain rebuilding some of his surplus planes he bought after the war; Sop. Camels and Spads which he used for photography work. While working there I met Red Noyes who was flying for Bill Davis some of the surplus DH6 which were equipped with OX5 Curtiss Motors. He asked me one day if I ever flew and I told him I was an Early Bird. He asked me to come along on one of his joyrides and he would let me fly the plane after we were in the air. Not being acquainted with the tractor plane, I kept climbing too much and flying around in circles. When we came down, he landed the plane and looked me over. Come to find out that the cloth covering started to come loose at the trailing edges which had pulled away from age. I worked for Chamberlain about 8 months when things got slow, so I quit airplane work for good and got into the auto work.

 I got a job as body man for a Ford dealer. That lasted about a year when a tire man down the street offered me a better job vulcanizing and rebuilding tires. He knew I knew something about building radios and it wasn't long after that he asked me about manufacturing our own radios to sell to the tire customers. I ended up buying a Radio Shop which he owned and ran in Englewood, NJ."

 Upon retirement he continued to build and fly his model planes at the Cape May airport where he sometimes took his granddaughters to watch.

Legacy
In recognition of his solo flight, he received a bronze plaque from the Early Birds of Aviation, of which he was a member.

External links

1891 births
1970 deaths
Members of the Early Birds of Aviation
American aviators